SriLankan Air Taxi was the domestic branch of SriLankan Airlines.  The airline flew to destinations across Sri Lanka and had its hub at the waterdrome at Peliyagoda, on the Kelani River.

Destinations
Sri Lankan AirTaxi served the following destinations:

Fleet
SriLankan AirTaxi operated two aircraft that were capable of landing on water.  Capacity was 15 passengers in each aircraft.

References

Airlines of Sri Lanka
Sri Lankan companies established in 2010
Airlines established in 2010
Airlines disestablished in 2013